Grange may refer to:

Buildings
 Grange House, Scotland, built in 1564, and demolished in 1906
 Grange Estate, Pennsylvania, built in 1682
 Monastic grange, a farming estate belonging to a monastery

Geography

Australia
 Grange, South Australia, a suburb of Adelaide
 Grange, Queensland, a suburb of Brisbane

Ireland

County Westmeath
 Grange, Kilbixy, a townland in Kilbixy civil parish, barony of Moygoish
 Grange, Kilcumreragh, a townland in Kilcumreragh civil parish, barony of Moycashel
 Grange, Lackan, a townland in Lackan civil parish, barony of Corkaree

Other counties
 Grange, either of two townlands in County Laois, in the baronies of Ballyadams and Tinnahinch
 Grange, Cork, a residential neighborhood in Douglas, County Cork, a suburb of the city of Cork
 Grange stone circle in County Limerick near Lough Gur
 Grange, County Sligo
 Grange, County Tipperary
 Grange, County Waterford

United Kingdom

England
 Grange, a hamlet in the Medway district of Kent
 Grange, a hamlet near Balderstone
 Grange, Merseyside, a suburb on the Wirral
 Grange, a suburb of Grimsby
 Grange, an electoral ward in Ellesmere Port, Cheshire
 Grange, a suburb of Runcorn, Cheshire
 Grange, a suburb of Warrington, Cheshire
 Grange (Southwark ward), an electoral ward in London
 Grange Chine, Isle of Wight
 Grange in Borrowdale, Cumbria, a village
 Grange-over-Sands, Cumbria, a town
 Grange Villa, County Durham, a village
 Creech Grange, Dorset, a country house
 Thedden Grange, Hampshire, a country house

Northern Ireland
 Grange, County Armagh, a parish: see Grange St Colmcille's GAC
 Grange, County Down, a townland in County Down
 Grange, County Tyrone, a townland in the parish of Desertcreat

Scotland
 Grange, East Ayrshire, a UK location
 The Grange, Edinburgh
 Grange, Moray
 Grange, Perth and Kinross, a settlement in Perthshire
 Grange Hill, North Ayrshire

Wales
 Grangetown, Cardiff, a district and community in the south of Cardiff.

United States
 Grange, Iowa

Vehicles
 Grange Class (or GWR 6800 Class), a class of steam locomotives built by Great Western Railway in 1936–1939
 HSV Grange, an Australian luxury car made by Holden Special Vehicles

Other uses
Grange (surname)
 G-Range (or AEDC Range G), a light-gas gun ballistic testing range at Arnold Air Force Base in Tennessee
 Gird's Grange, a fictional building in The Deed of Paksenarrion series of fantasy books
 Grange or The Grange, a chapter of the National Grange of the Order of Patrons of Husbandry in the United States
 Operation Grange, a British police review of the disappearance of Madeleine McCann
 Penfolds Grange, an Australian wine

See also

 
 
 The Grange (disambiguation) (with the definite article "the")
 Grange Academy (disambiguation)
 Grange School (disambiguation)
 Lagrange (disambiguation)
 Newgrange (disambiguation)
 Oldgrange (disambiguation)
 Granger (disambiguation)